The 2011 Sporting Challenger was a professional tennis tournament played on clay courts. It was the tenth edition of the tournament which was part of the 2011 ATP Challenger Tour and the Tretorn SERIE+ series. It took place in Turin, Italy between June 26 and July 3, 2011.

ATP entrants

Seeds

 1 Rankings are as of June 20, 2011.

Other entrants
The following players received wildcards into the singles main draw:
  Andrea Arnaboldi
  Alessandro Giannessi
  Stefano Travaglia
  Matteo Trevisan

The following players received entry from the qualifying draw:
  Alberto Brizzi
  Marco Crugnola
  Stefano Galvani
  Dušan Lajović

Champions

Singles

 Carlos Berlocq def.  Albert Ramos, 6–4, 6–3

Doubles

 Martin Fischer /  Philipp Oswald def.  Uladzimir Ignatik /  Martin Kližan, 6–3, 6–4

External links
Official Website
ITF Search
ATP official site

References

Sporting Challenger
Sporting Challenger
Clay court tennis tournaments
Sporting Challenger
Sporting Challenger
Sporting Challenger